Dow Brain is an American music producer, songwriter/composer and pianist. A Boston native, Brain started his music production company, Underground Productions, Inc. in 1992, in collaboration with Brad Young. One of their first clients was Danny Wood of boy-band New Kids on the Block. Since then Brain has written and produced multiple Billboard charting albums and singles and has had thousands of music placements in films and TV shows, some include: Weeds, Kyle XY, The Sopranos, Greek, Scrubs, America's Funniest Videos, The Oprah Winfrey Show and several others.

Career
Most recently, he produced and recorded UK pop vocalist Lauren Bennett’s vocal for the LMFAO hit Party Rock Anthem, which became a number 1 hit on the Billboard pop charts.

His selected credits and discography also include: Compositions for the Do It Again film score -- Robert Patton-Spruill’s documentary about The Boston Globe reporter Geoff Edgers' quest to reunite The Kinks; the theme song and much of the score for the TV Land hit series How'd You Get So Rich? featuring Joan Rivers; and the theme song for the History Channel series The Works.

Brain has produced five RIAA certified Platinum and Gold albums and singles, including a Platinum single for the number-one selling song Summer Girls, recorded by LFO on Arista Records.

Brain has done co-publishing deals with BMG Music and PSO Ltd.

References

Year of birth missing (living people)
Living people
American music industry executives